Sonya Kilkenny (born 15 May 1969) is an Australian politician. She has been a Labor Party member of the Victorian Legislative Assembly since November 2014, representing the Electoral district of Carrum. 

Kilkenny first entered parliament at the 2014 Victorian state election when she narrowly won the seat off the Liberal incumbent, before holding the seat at the 2018 Victorian state election with an 11.2% swing, one of the biggest swings in the election.

Kilkenny served on the Scrutiny of Acts and Regulations Committee and was an Acting Speaker in the Legislative Assembly.

On 29 November 2018, Kilkenny was appointed Parliamentary Secretary for Early Childhood Education and in 2020 appointed Cabinet Secretary.

Kilkenny was born in Sydney, and attended schools in Hong Kong and the United States before returning to Australia. She graduated from the University of New South Wales with a Bachelor of Arts and Bachelor of Laws, and later with a Master of Laws from the University of Melbourne. She has worked as a legal officer or lawyer for organisations such as the Kimberley Land Council and the Australian Children's Television Foundation, and served on the boards of the Back to Back Theatre company and the National Theatre in St Kilda. Just prior to her election, she was head of the legal dispute resolution team at the ANZ Banking Group. Sonya has lived in the Carrum Electorate for over 10 years.

She previously contested the federal Division of Dunkley for Labor at the 2013 federal election.

Kilkenny was appointed as Minister for Corrections, Minister for Youth Justice, Minister for Victim Support and Minister for Fishing and Boating as part of a June 2022 cabinet reshuffle. She was sworn in on 4 July, a week after the rest of the cabinet, due to isolating after contracting COVID-19.

On 5 December 2022, Kilkenny was sworn in as the Minister for Planning and the Minister for Outdoor Recreation.

References

External links
 Sonya Kilkenny on Facebook

 Parliamentary voting record of Sonya Kilkenny at Victorian Parliament Tracker

1969 births
Living people
Australian Labor Party members of the Parliament of Victoria
Members of the Victorian Legislative Assembly
Australian women lawyers
University of New South Wales alumni
University of New South Wales Law School alumni
Melbourne Law School alumni
21st-century Australian politicians
21st-century Australian women politicians
Women members of the Victorian Legislative Assembly
20th-century Australian lawyers
21st-century Australian lawyers
Politicians from Sydney